The Ven. Richard Henry Roberts (23 April 1884 – 6 July 1970) was a British Anglican clergyman in the Church in Wales who served as Archdeacon of St Asaph from 1942 to 1959.

He was born in Brynamman, Glamorgan, and educated at Keble College, Oxford, and ordained in 1908.  He held incumbencies at Llangennech, Betws with Ammanford and Rhyl  before his appointment as Archdeacon.

He retired in 1959 and died in Swansea in 1970.

References

Alumni of Keble College, Oxford
20th-century Welsh Anglican priests
Archdeacons of St Asaph
1884 births
1970 deaths

People from Brynamman